Boxing is one of the sports at the quadrennial Mediterranean Games competition. It has been one of the sports competed at the event since the inaugural edition in 1951.

Editions

All-time medal table
Updated after the 2022 Mediterranean Games

See also
Boxing at the All-Africa Games

External links
Boxing at the Mediterranean Games results - Amateur Boxing Results

 
Boxing
Mediterranean Games
Mediterranean Games
Mediterranean Games
Mediterranean Games
Mediterranean Games